Natacha Boyengwa Bakonga (born 23 January 1999), known as Natacha Boyengwa, is a DR Congolese footballer who plays as a defender for FC Bilenge and the DR Congo women's national team.

International career
Boyengwa capped for the DR Congo at senior level during the 2020 CAF Women's Olympic Qualifying Tournament (third round).

See also
 List of Democratic Republic of the Congo women's international footballers

References

1999 births
Living people
Women's association football defenders
Democratic Republic of the Congo women's footballers
Democratic Republic of the Congo women's international footballers